Peter Stead (born 1943) is a Welsh writer, broadcaster and historian.

Stead was born in 1943 in Barry, Wales, and attended grammar schools at Barry and Gowerton.  A graduate of Swansea University, he was subsequently a visiting Fulbright scholar at Wellesley College, and at the University of North Carolina. He is Chairman of the Dylan Thomas Literary Prize, and along with the late Patrick Hannan, Stead has been a member of the Welsh team in the radio series Round Britain Quiz for several years.

Works
Coleg Harlech (1976)
Ivor Allchurch (Christopher Davies, 1998)
Film and the Working Class (1989)
Richard Burton: So Much, So Little (1991)
Dennis Potter (1995)
Acting Wales: Stars of Stage and Screen (2002)

References

1943 births
Welsh broadcasters
Living people
People educated at Gowerton Grammar School
20th-century Welsh historians
Historians of Wales
21st-century Welsh historians